Piers Butler of Cahir (1425–1464) was the son of James "Gallda" Butler. 
He was born and died in Tipperary, Ireland.

Marriage and Children
He married Ellice Macfeoris Moore (1420–1450) and together they had two sons
 Thomas (1448–1476)
 John Butler

See also
 Butler dynasty

References

15th-century Irish people
Year of birth uncertain
1464 deaths
Piers
1425 births